KUCO-LD, virtual and UHF digital channel 27, is a low-powered Univision-affiliated television station licensed to Chico, California, United States. Owned by the Sinclair Broadcast Group, it is sister to Redding-licensed ABC affiliate KRCR-TV (channel 7) and four other low-power stations: Chico-licensed Antenna TV affiliate KXVU-LD (analog channel 17); MyNetworkTV affiliates Redding-licensed KRVU-LD (channel 21) and Chico-licensed KZVU-LD (channel 22), and Chico-licensed UniMás affiliate KKTF-LD (channel 30). Sinclair also operates Paradise-licensed Fox affiliate KCVU (channel 20) through a local marketing agreement (LMA) with owner Cunningham Broadcasting. However, Sinclair effectively owns KCVU as the majority of Cunningham's stock is owned by the family of deceased group founder Julian Smith.

The stations share studios on Auditorium Drive east of downtown Redding and maintain a news bureau and sales office at the former Sainte Television Group facilities on Main Street in downtown Chico. For FCC and other legal purposes, the Chico/Paradise-licensed stations still use the Chico address and Redding-licensed stations use the Redding address. KUCO-LD's transmitter is located along Cohasset Road northeast of Chico.

KEUV-LD (channel 35) in Eureka operates as a semi-satellite of KUCO-LD. As such, it simulcasts all Univision programming as provided through KUCO but airs separate local commercials and legal station identifications. Although KEUV-LD maintains its own studios (shared with KAEF-TV and LMA partner KBVU) on Sixth Street in downtown Eureka, master control and some internal operations are based at KUCO's facilities.

History

KUCO-LP was founded by country-western singer Chester Smith's broadcast company Sainte Partners II, L.P. and first hit the air in 1998 to help bring Spanish-language television to the growing Spanish-speaking population in Northern California. It was the first Spanish-language station to air in the Chico/Redding market. It would soon be joined by Telemundo affiliate KXVU-LP and UniMás affiliate KKTF-LD, both also founded by Smith's company.

In 2014, six years after Smith's death, his company sold KUCO-LP and the remaining stations to Bonten Media Group, owners of ABC affiliate KRCR-TV in Redding.

On an unknown date in either 2016 or 2017, KUCO-LP conducted an unauthorized test of the Emergency Alert System. However, the message read that the activation was for an Emergency Action Notification. It is unknown if any panic from residents followed.

On April 21, 2017, Sinclair Broadcast Group announced its intent to purchase the Bonten stations (including KUCO-LP) for $240 million. The sale was completed September 1, 2017.

The station changed its call sign to KUCO-LD on April 5, 2019, coincident with receiving its license for digital operations.

Technical information

Subchannels
The station's digital signal is multiplexed:

References

External links
 

Univision network affiliates
UCO-LD
UCO-LD
Sinclair Broadcast Group
Television channels and stations established in 2003
2003 establishments in California
Low-power television stations in the United States